Jung Gyu-woon (born June 28, 1982) is a South Korean actor.

Career
Jung Gyu-woon made acting his debut in 2004 with the mobile drama Five Stars. He first gained notice in 2008 when he took two contrasting roles — as a crazy young executive in Bitter Sweet Life and a calm and patient boyfriend who suffers for love in Women of the Sun.

His popularity grew with the 2009 melodramas Again, My Love, and Loving You a Thousand Times; the latter became the first Korean drama exported to Bulgaria. In 2010 to 2011, Jung began to get cast in leading roles, which included a judo athlete training for the Olympics in Dr. Champ, a cop working in the violent crimes division in forensic medical series Sign, and a man who falls for a maid in Romance Town.

Jung received the best reviews of his career yet for his portrayal of a corporate spy in 2012's History of a Salaryman. This was followed by the family drama Wonderful Mama (2013), the time travel thriller God's Gift - 14 Days (2014), and the makeover romantic comedy Birth of a Beauty (2014).

In October 2021, Jung signed a contract with Dear ENT.

Personal life
Jung married his girlfriend, a former model turned web designer, on April 5, 2014. On March 30, 2016 it was reported that he has divorced.

In April 2017, Jung confirmed to be in a romantic relationship with a non-celebrity.
According to Jung's agency, he will be marrying for the second time on September 30, 2017. His fiancé is revealed to be a music student who majored in classical piano. The couple has been dating for one year before deciding to marry.

Filmography

Television series

Film

Television show

Music video

Theater

Awards and nominations

References

External links
  at C9 Entertainment 

South Korean male film actors
South Korean male television actors
South Korean male models
1982 births
Living people
Place of birth missing (living people)